Curtis Taylor (born 6 April 2000) is an Australian rules footballer playing for  in the Australian Football League (AFL). He played junior football in the TAC Cup before he was selected in the 2018 AFL draft. Taylor made his AFL debut in the 2019 season.

Junior career 
In 2016, Taylor played in a senior Essendon District Football League premiership with Keilor. He played football the next year for the Calder Cannons in the TAC Cup as a bottom-ager. In 2018, Taylor averaged one goal and 18 disposals per match for the Cannons and represented Vic Metro at the 2018 AFL Under 18 Championships. Throughout the year, he mostly played as a forward but had stints in the midfield. Ahead of the 2018 AFL draft, Taylor strained his adductor and was unable to test at the draft combine. He was considered likely to be drafted in the late first round to second round – he was invited by the AFL to the first night of the draft – and often compared to medium West Coast forward Mark LeCras. Taylor's accurate kicking and marking were praised but his speed was highlighted as a deficiency.

AFL career 
Taylor was drafted by North Melbourne with pick 46 in the 2018 national draft. He was often cited as a draft "slider", which The Age attributed to clubs' concerns over his commitment at training. He made his AFL debut in round 8 of the 2019 season after Scott Thompson was ruled out with an adductor injury.

References

External links 

Living people
2000 births
Australian rules footballers from Victoria (Australia)
Calder Cannons players
North Melbourne Football Club players
People educated at Penleigh and Essendon Grammar School